Delijaš is a village in the municipality of Trnovo, Bosnia and Herzegovina.

Delijaš is the location of a large reception centre for asylum seekers, managed by the Ministry of Security.

Demographics 
According to the 2013 census, its population was 60, all Bosniaks.

References

Populated places in Trnovo, Sarajevo